Brooklyn Field Club was a soccer team based in Brooklyn, New York, that existed from 1898 to 1924. It is one of the few to predate the United States Soccer Federation, which was founded in 1913.

Between 1909 and 1916 they played in the second National Association Football League (NAFBL), winning the 1913–1914 title.  

The team was the first to win the National Challenge Cup, the earliest version of what was to be known from 1999 as the Lamar Hunt U.S. Open Cup in 1914 defeating Brooklyn Celtic in the final 2–1.

Honors
 National Association Foot Ball League
 Winner (1): 1913–14
 National Challenge Cup
 Winner (1): 1914

National Association Football League teams
Defunct soccer clubs in New York (state)
Men's soccer clubs in New York (state)
1898 establishments in New York City
1924 disestablishments in New York (state)
Defunct sports teams in New York City
Sports in Brooklyn
U.S. Open Cup winners